Ariella Aïsha Azoulay (born Tel Aviv, 1962) is an author, art curator, filmmaker, and theorist of photography and visual culture. She is a professor of Modern Culture and Media and the Department of Comparative Literature at Brown University and an independent curator of Archives and Exhibitions.

She received the Igor Zabel Award, in 2010, for the exhibition Untaken Photographs.

Early life 

Azoulay has degrees from Université Paris VIII, Ecole des Hautes Etudes en Sciences Sociales and Tel Aviv University.

Azoulay is of Algerian descent and identifies as "an Arab Jew and a Palestinian Jew of African origins".

Academic career 

In 1999 she began teaching at Bar-Ilan University. In 2010 Azoulay was denied tenure at Bar-Ilan, a move regarded by some colleagues and commentators as politically motivated. In 2010 she was the Gladstein Visiting professor at the Human Rights Center of the University of Connecticut. In 2011 she was Leverhulme Research Professor at Durham University, and she is currently assistant professor of Comparative Literature and Modern Culture and Media at Brown University's Watson Institute for International Studies.

Her partner, with whom she has also co-authored written work, is the philosopher Adi Ophir.

Theory 

Throughout her career, Azoulay developed concepts and approaches around the reversal of imperial violence. The theoretical framework she proposed have far-reaching implications in a number of knowledge fields, such as political theory, archival science, visual and photography studies.

Potential history 

In her book Potential History: Unlearning Imperialism (Verso, 2019), Azoulay studies historical objects (from photographs to documents) belonging to archives and museum collections. In her opinion, the museums must be de-imperialized, as well as the discipline of history itself. She suggests a methodology and an ethics for engaging with historical and archival materials that allows the historical present discussion to come forward; refusing to relegate these materials to a foreclosed past. In her words:

Azoulay invites both the scholar and the public to see the imminent potential in such objects for fostering nonimperial forms of identification and meaning. In her perspective, the archive is not only a repository of documents but a regime of procedures interwoven with imperialist dogmas. Therefore, the Potential History is an ongoing process of revising these dogmas, through ontology and epistemology. In other words, this kind of history writing should question both the nature of things and the way one understand them. This discussion relates to decolonial theories.

Furthermore, Azoulay notes how the decolonization of museums is not possible without the decolonization of the world itself.

Works

Writing 

The following is available in English translation:

 Death's Showcase: the power of image in contemporary democracy, 2001
 The Civil Contract of Photography, Zone Books, 2008
 From Palestine to Israel: A Photographic Record of Destruction and State Formation, 1947–1950, Pluto Press, 2011
 Civil Imagination: A Political Ontology of Photography, 2011
 (With Adi Ophir) This Regime Which Is Not One: Occupation and Democracy between the Sea and The River (1967 – ), Stanford University Press, 2011
 (With Adi Ophir) The One-State Condition: Occupation and Democracy in Israel/Palestine, Stanford University Press
 Different ways not to say deportation, Fillip Editions/Artspeak, 2013
 Potential History: Unlearning Imperialism, Verso Books, November 2019

Films 

 The Food Chain (2010)
 The Angel of History
 Civil Alliance (2012)
 Un-Documented: Unlearning Imperial Plunder (2019)

Exhibitions 

 Everything Could Be Seen (Al Fahem Gallery, Umm Al Fahem, 2004)
 Untaken Photographs (Ljubljana Museum of Modern Art, Galeria Moderna, Zochrot, 2010).
 Potential History (Center For Digital Art, Holon, 2012)
 The Body Politic I (Reina Sofia, Madrid, 2014)
 Horizontal Photography, of Aim Deüelle Lüski (MOBY Museum, 2014)
 Errata (Tapiès Foundation, 2019; HKW, Berlin, 2020)
 Enough! The Natural Violence of New World Order (F/Stop photography festival, Leipzig, 2016)
 Act of State 1967–2007, (Exhibition Tour, 2007–present)
 The Natural History of Rape (Berlin Biennale, KW Institute for Contemporary Art, 2022)

Prizes 

 Igor Zabel Award, 2010, for Untaken Photographs exhibition.

References

External links 

 Ariella Aïsha Azoulay personal website.

1962 births
Living people
Film people from Tel Aviv
Photography critics
Jewish Israeli writers
Jewish philosophers
Israeli Arab Jews
Israeli critics
Israeli people of Algerian-Jewish descent
Israeli filmmakers
Academic staff of Bar-Ilan University
School for Advanced Studies in the Social Sciences alumni
University of Paris alumni
Tel Aviv University alumni
Brown University faculty
Israeli expatriates in France
Academics of Durham University
Israeli women curators
Art curators